Mikołaj Firlej (died 1588) was a Lublin voivode.

References

Year of birth missing
1588 deaths
Lublin Voivodes
Mikolaj
16th-century Polish nobility